How To Eat To Live is a series of two books published by Nation of Islam leader Elijah Muhammad in the 1960s, which are still in print. The books cover his philosophies on healthy eating and the Black Muslims' prescribed diet.

References

Health and wellness books
Nation of Islam
Books about food and drink